Raymond Francis Meagher  (born 4 July 1944) is an Australian actor, who has appeared in Australian film and television since the mid-1970s. He is notable as the longest continuing performer in an Australian television role, portraying Alf Stewart on  Home and Away, having played the role since the first episode in 1988. Meagher won a Gold Logie Award for his role in Home and Away in 2010 and currently played the role of Alf for over 35 years.

Early life
Meagher was born and raised on a sheep and cattle station in Queensland, before attending a boarding school on the Gold Coast from the age of nine. He became a keen sportsman at high school, Marist College Ashgrove in Brisbane, representing the school at a number of sports including rugby union, a sport which he ultimately played at state level.

Meagher played at first five eighth for Queensland at senior level in the late 1960s, including playing against France.

Career

Film
His early film roles included appearances Breaker Morant, The Chant of Jimmie Blacksmith, Newsfront, My Brilliant Career and The Shiralee. He also had a cameo in the 1979 war comedy The Odd Angry Shot.

Television
He first appeared on television as host of the late night ABC folk music programme Around Folk in June–August 1973. His first regular acting work on television was in the soap opera Number 96, briefly appearing as Fred Shrimpton in 1977. Subsequent television acting roles included three different roles as villains in Prisoner, including Geoff Butler between 1979 and 1980, Kurt Renner in 1984, and Ernest Craven in 1986. He also had two different guest starring roles in A Country Practice and substantial roles in several 1980s miniseries, including A Fortunate Life.

Meagher joined the cast of soap opera Home and Away in 1987 and has appeared in the role of Alf Stewart continuously since the first episode aired in January 1988. Meagher holds a Guinness World Record as the longest-serving actor in an Australian serial.

In September 2009, Meagher was the third-highest paid personality on Australian television, behind Eddie McGuire and Rove McManus.<ref>Clune, Richard (13 September 2009). "Flamin' heck! Alf Stewart's worth a quid". Sunday Mail (Adelaide).</ref>

Meagher won the Gold Logie Award for Most Popular Personality on Australian Television at the 2010 Logie Awards, where he was also nominated for "Most Popular Actor". Meagher subsequently won that Logie Award in 2018.

Stage
In 2007, Meagher took over the role of Bob the mechanic in Priscilla Queen of the Desert from Bill Hunter. From 30 September 2010, he took over the role of Bob in the West End production of Priscilla until March 2011. In June 2011, it was announced that Meagher would be returning to the West End production from October. He then rejoined the show for its New Zealand tour in 2016.

Meagher regularly travels to the United Kingdom to take part in the traditional Christmas pantomimes. In December 2008, he played Abanazar in a production of Aladdin at the Anvil Theatre in Basingstoke and in 2009 he performed as Captain Hook in Peter Pan'' at the Assembly Hall Theatre in Tunbridge Wells.

Filmography

Film

Television

References

External links
 
 Profile at Home and Away site
 Profile from UK TV channel Five

1944 births
Living people
Australian people of Irish descent
People from Roma, Queensland
Australian male film actors
Australian male soap opera actors
Recipients of the Medal of the Order of Australia
Gold Logie winners
Queensland Reds players
Australian rugby union players
Rugby union fly-halves
Male actors from Queensland
20th-century Australian male actors
21st-century Australian male actors